Marta is a female given name derived from the Aramaic name ܡܳܪܬܳܐ (Mârtâ, in Syriac script, מָרְתָא in Hebrew script), which translates as "the lady" in English. It had the male form "Martinus" in Roman culture. It has been described as a cognate of Martha.

The name Marta should not be confused with the similar-looking Swedish name Märta, which derives from the Greek name Margaret and means "pearl".

People with the given name
Marta Abba (1900–1988), Italian stage actress
Marta Acosta, American fiction novelist
Marta Andrino (born 1987), Portuguese actress
Marta Balletbò-Coll (born 1960), Spanish actress and film director
Marta Bassino (born 1996), Italian alpine skier
Marta Batinović (born 1990), Croatian-Montenegrin handball player
Marta Bunge, Argentine-Canadian mathematician
Marta Camps Arbestain, New Zealand soil scientist
Marta Cartabia (born 1963), Italian judge
Marta Civil, American mathematics educator
Marta Crawford, Portuguese psychologist and author
Marta Damkowski (1911–1979), German activist and politician
Marta Domachowska (born 1986), Polish tennis player
Marta Domingo (born 1935), Mexican soprano and opera director
Marta Domínguez (born 1975), Spanish track and field runner
Marta Drpa (born 1989), Serbian volleyball player
Marta Eggerth (1912–2013), Hungarian singer and actress
Márta Fábián (born 1946), Hungarian musician
Marta Fascina (born 1990), Italian politician
Marta Ferri (born 1984), Italian fashion designer
Marta Fitzgerald, former spouse of Rush Limbaugh
Marta García 1949–2017, Cuban ballerina
Marta Hidy (1927–2010), Hungarian-Canadian violinist, conductor and music teacher
Marta Jandová (born 1974), Czech musician
Márta Károlyi (born 1942), Romanian gymnastics coach
Marta Kauffman (born 1956), American writer and TV producer
Marta Kostyuk (born 2002), Ukrainian tennis player
Marta Kristen (born 1945), Norwegian-born American actress; (Lost In Space)
Marta Laan (born 1985), Estonian actress
Márta Lacza (born 1946), Hungarian graphic artist and portrait painter
Marta Marrero (born 1983), Spanish former tennis player
Marta Menegatti (born 1990), Italian beach volleyball player
Marta Míguez (born 1973), Spanish former javelin thrower
Marta Pessarrodona (born 1941), Spanish writer
Marta Peterson, musician in the band Bleeding Through
Marta Rădulescu (1912–1959), Romanian novelist
Marta Rosique (born 1996), Spanish politician
Marta Roure (born 1981), Andorran singer and actress
Marta Sánchez (born 1966), Spanish pop singer
Márta Sebestyén (born 1957), Hungarian folk singer
Marta Segarra (born 1963), Spanish philologist, university professor, and researcher
Marta Sillaots (1887–1969), Estonian writer, translator, and literary critic
Marta (footballer), Marta Vieira da Silva, (born 1986), Brazilian women's football player
Marta Suplicy (born 1945), Brazilian politician and psychologist
Marta Tomac (born 1990), Croatian-Norwegian handball player
Marta Tufet, British public health researcher
Marta Moreno Vega (born 1942), Puerto Rican scholar of Afro-Latino studies & African diaspora studies, researcher, and artist associated with El Museo del Barrio

Fictional characters
Marta Estrella, from the television show Arrested Development.
 Marta von Trapp, a character from The Sound of Music.
Marta Cabrerra, from the 2019 movie Knives Out.
Marta Trundel, a character from iCarly.

References

Aramaic-language names
Feminine given names
Russian feminine given names
Italian feminine given names
Serbian feminine given names
Slovene feminine given names
Croatian feminine given names
Macedonian feminine given names
Bulgarian feminine given names
Slavic feminine given names
Polish feminine given names
English feminine given names
Portuguese feminine given names
Spanish feminine given names
Romanian feminine given names
Czech feminine given names
Slovak feminine given names
Hungarian feminine given names
German feminine given names
Dutch feminine given names
Estonian feminine given names
Catalan feminine given names